Philipp Oswald and Filip Polášek were the defending champions but chose not to defend their title.

Sadio Doumbia and Fabien Reboul won the title after defeating Paolo Lorenzi and Juan Pablo Varillas 7–6(7–5), 7–5 in the final.

Seeds

Draw

References

External links
 Main draw

Garden Open - Doubles
2021 Doubles
Garden